Biodynamics may refer to:
 Biodynamic agriculture, a method of farming based on the teachings of Rudolf Steiner
 The Biodynamic Association, a United States-based company that promotes the Biodynamic agriculture system
 Biodynamic wine, wines made by employing the biodynamic methods
 Biodynamic massage, a complementary therapy developed by Gerda Boyesen in Norway during the 1950s